George Michanowsky (born Georgei Ilyich Mikhanovsky; ; March 9, 1920 – November 15, 1993) is known for his interpretation of rock art in Bolivia and Mesopotamian artefacts which he interpreted as referring to a supernova explosion in the Vela (constellation) which he dated to about 6000 years ago. He is described by Kenn Harper as a having "claimed to be a self-taught archaeologist, linguist, Egyptologist, epigrapher, and expert in Mesopotamian astronomy.

Michanowsky was born in Yalta, Crimea in 1920 during the ongoing turmoil following the Russian Revolution.

In 1977, he published a book called The Once and Future Star in which he explained his theory of supernova explosion in a constellation named Vela which happened 7,000 years ago. In the same work he also mentions that Atlantis is called NI-DUK-KI in Sumerian texts and used to be Isle of the Blest before the flood. Later on, as he explained, after the flood, it was named Dilmun.  Michanowsky also suggested that global warming played an effect in Atlantis disappearance.

References

1920 births
1993 deaths
People from Yalta
Scientists from New York City
Soviet emigrants to the United States